Schneebergbahn may refer to:

 Schneeberg Railway a railway network in Austria that includes the:
 Schneeberg Railway (cog railway), a rack railway up the Schneeberg  mountain near Vienna, Austria.